Following are the results of the Ukrainian Football Amateur League 2009 season.  Participation is restricted to the regional (Oblast) champions and/or the most regarded team by the respective regional association.

Teams

Returning
 Olimpik Kirovohrad

Debut
List of teams that are debuting this season in the league.

FC Morshyn, Kniahynyn Pidhaichyky, Zbruch Volochysk, Irpin Horenychi, KNTEU, Bastion-2 Illichivsk

Withdrawn
List of clubs that took part in last year competition, but chose not to participate in 2009 season:

 Sokil Zolochiv
 BRB-VIK Volodymyr-Volynskyi
 Metalurh Malyn
 Kholodnyi Yar Kamianka

 Sokil Berezhany
 Volyn-Tsement Zdolbuniv
 Zirka Kyiv
 Chornomornaftohaz Simferopol

 Karpaty Yaremche
 Polissia-2 Zhytomyr
 Ametyst Oleksandriya
 Illich Osypenko

Location map

First stage

Group 1

Group 2

Group 3

Group 4

Second stage
The games in the group took place on September 11 through 15th in Mykolaiv and Ochakiv.

Group 1

Group 2
The games in the group took place on September 17 through 20 in Slovyansk.

Championship match

References
Standing  
Second Stage games 
Conclusion of the second stage 
Final will take place in Cherkasy land 

Ukrainian Football Amateur League seasons
Amateur
Amateur